Caloptilia dicamica is a moth of the family Gracillariidae. It is known from Brunei.

References

dicamica
Moths of Asia
Moths described in 1993